Balanbale, also spelled as Balanbal, is the district in Galguduud region of Somalia.

Geography
Balanbale is situated in central Somalia, near kilinka Shanad. The city is situated about 90 km west of Dusamareb, the capital of Galguduud province.

Districts
Balanbele is subdivided into several administrative districts:
 Waaberi
 Canjiidle
 Oktoobar
 Dhagax-barkato

References

 Balanbal, herale, Galgaduud: None_Somalia_Postcode Query
 Current Time in Balanbal - WorldCityTime
 

Geography of Somalia